Bothriomyrmex paradoxus is a species of ant in the genus Bothriomyrmex. Described by Dubovikov and Longino in 2004, the species is endemic to Costa Rica and Honduras.

References

External links

Bothriomyrmex
Hymenoptera of North America
Insects of Central America
Insects described in 2004